Hinesville is an unincorporated community in Pittsylvania County, in the U.S. state of Virginia.

Its Zip Code is 24549 (Dry Fork, Pittsylvania County, Virginia).

References

Unincorporated communities in Virginia
Unincorporated communities in Pittsylvania County, Virginia